Herne Bay  is an affluent suburb of Auckland, New Zealand. It is located on the southwestern shore of the Waitematā Harbour to the west of the Auckland Harbour Bridge. It is known for its extensive harbour views, marine villas and Edwardian age homes. Herne Bay has been a prosperous area since the 1850s due to its outlook over the Waitemata Harbour. It continues to be an exclusive suburb, as it ranked as the most expensive suburb in New Zealand in 2015. In 2021 it again topped rankings of the most expensive suburbs in New Zealand, with a median property value of $3.25 million.  

Herne Bay is under the local governance of Auckland Council.

Demographics

Herne Bay had a population of 3,036 at the 2018 New Zealand census, an increase of 96 people (3.3%) since the 2013 census, and an increase of 54 people (1.8%) since the 2006 census. There were 1,233 households, comprising 1,488 males and 1,548 females, giving a sex ratio of 0.96 males per female. The median age was 44.0 years (compared with 37.4 years nationally), with 519 people (17.1%) aged under 15 years, 495 (16.3%) aged 15 to 29, 1,542 (50.8%) aged 30 to 64, and 480 (15.8%) aged 65 or older.

Ethnicities were 92.4% European/Pākehā, 5.5% Māori, 2.0% Pacific peoples, 6.1% Asian, and 2.4% other ethnicities. People may identify with more than one ethnicity.

The percentage of people born overseas was 23.2, compared with 27.1% nationally.

Although some people chose not to answer the census's question about religious affiliation, 53.9% had no religion, 37.4% were Christian, 0.1% had Māori religious beliefs, 0.6% were Hindu, 0.2% were Muslim, 0.7% were Buddhist and 2.3% had other religions.

Of those at least 15 years old, 1,278 (50.8%) people had a bachelor's or higher degree, and 159 (6.3%) people had no formal qualifications. The median income was $62,100, compared with $31,800 nationally. 1,137 people (45.2%) earned over $70,000 compared to 17.2% nationally. The employment status of those at least 15 was that 1,434 (57.0%) people were employed full-time, 342 (13.6%) were part-time, and 69 (2.7%) were unemployed.

History 

The suburb is named after Herne Bay, a fashionable but respectable seaside resort in English county of Kent.

From the 1850s onwards it became apparent that Auckland's Herne Bay was quite handy to the centre of town by a short boat trip. Herne Bay developed as an early commuter suburb and was the location of several large houses belonging to members of the professional classes. Most of these houses (termed 'marine villas') were readily accessible from the water, with their own jetties and boathouses - in some cases there was not any land route to them. Some of these early houses still exist, surrounded by later houses which were built as their large properties were subdivided around the turn of the 20th century.

Also located in this area on the shore of Ponsonby (between Argyle Street and the sea) was Kemp's Gardens. This was a popular pleasure resort for Auckland's people during the 1860s. The gardens were "complete with pavilion, gardens and illuminations": "A free hand was given, drinks were sold, music was provided and the least said the better". Later renamed "Cremorne Gardens" after the fashionable pleasure gardens in London, Kemp's gardens boasted a "Dancing Pavilion, ten acres of walks and sports grounds". It is remembered in the name "Cremorne Street".

Twenty-first century 

In late 2008, Herne Bay became New Zealand's first "$2 million suburb", when the median house price surpassed the $2 million mark.

The Sultan of Brunei purchased 11 properties in Herne Bay for his visit to the APEC Summit in Auckland in 1999, these were all extensively renovated, although the Sultan never actually lived in any of them. All 11 properties were sold to low profile businessman Gary Lane in 2005.

Schools 

Nearby secondary schools include Auckland Girls' Grammar School, Western Springs College (Coed), St Paul's College (Catholic boys) and Saint Mary's College (Catholic girls).

Notable buildings 

 Baptist Church, 43 Jervois Road. A wooden building in the Classical style. This church contains an organ reputed to be the oldest in Australsia, possibly used by Queen Charlotte at Windsor Castle or Kew Palace it was given by Queen Victoria to the St Paul's Church in Emily Place, here in Auckland. After that building was demolished and rebuilt on Symonds Street with a new big up-to-date organ this chamber organ made its way into the possession of the Baptist Church here.
 St Stephen's Presbyterian Church. Corner of Jervois Road and Shelly Beach Road. Wooden Gothic Church with impressive interior.
 Stichbury Terrace. Corner of Jervois Road and Curran Street. Neo-Classical Apartment Block from around 1915.
 Ponsonby Primary School. 44 Curran Street. The main building is an intact example of the Arts & Crafts style employed for educational facilities just around the First World War. Reinforced concrete construction with brick and stucco detailing, Marseilles tile roof and metal windows. Prior to 1920 this property was occupied by a Chinese Market Garden.
 Shangri-la Apartments. 97-103 Jervois Road. Late 1980s High-rise apartment block; this building contains a mere 16 apartments many of which occupy an entire floor.
 Turret House 4 Shelly Beach Road. Large Edwardian Mansion with a roof-top turret. Currently a bed and breakfast hotel.
 Westwater Apartments. 10 Shelly Beach Road. High rise apartment block from the 1980s.
 Dome House. 11 Shelly Beach Road (corner Cameron Street). Unusual large Edwardian house in the American Queen Anne Style - a landmark due to its large domed corner turret.
 Stebbing Recording Studios. 108-114 Jervois Road.
 Art-Deco Flats. 175-183 Jervois Road. Four apartment blocks built in the 1930s on land previously owned by the tram company.
 The Gables. 248 Jervois Road. Dating from the early 1970s this was the first pub to be built in this previously dry area. The building was designed to harmonise with the surrounding bay villas and so imitated their roof line, hence the name "The Gables". Up until this time pubs had a very bad reputation not helped by the six o'clock closing culture which was in existence between 1917 and 1969. This pub was intended to be a new type of establishment with outdoor dining facilities where family groups could socialise along the lines of continental European cafes and beer gardens.
 Former Bayfield School. 272 Jervois Road. Wooden Edwardian school now used for preschool activities. Typical example of the building created by the Ministry of Works for schools of the period.
 Sea Breeze Motel. 213 Jervois Road. Interesting example of 1950s exotica architecture.
 286 Jervois Road. Large two storied Edwardian Italianate house. Recently restored.
 235 Jervois Road. Arts & Crafts Cottage by Basil Hooper. Single storied wooden house from around 1928 by a prominent Arts & Crafts architect. Probably done in conjunction with the Chapman Taylor house next door. Wood, brick and Marseilles tile roof.
 Williamson House. 237 Jervois Road. Important 1928 Arts & Crafts house by Jame Walter Chapman Taylor for Francis H. Williamson. Two-storied masonry house with stucco facades, Marseilles tile roof and metal framed windows.
 Hawke Sea Scout Hall, 55 West End Road.  First built in 1928 on this site, rebuilt 1952 after a fire in a vernacular site by local volunteers with timber donated by US Marine Corps. Recently restored in traditional style.

References 

A Hundred Years in Herne Bay, Marjory F.E. Adams 2001

External links

Photographs of Herne Bay held in Auckland Libraries' heritage collections.

Suburbs of Auckland
Waitematā Local Board Area
Populated places around the Waitematā Harbour
Bays of the Auckland Region